Totten Inlet lies in the southern end of Puget Sound in the U.S. state of Washington. The inlet shoals gradually to near Burns Point, 100 feet high, on the south shore, where it bares at low tide.

Totten Inlet splits into two smaller inlets, Oyster Bay and Little Skookum Inlet. Oyster Bay, located south of Burns Point, is an extensive mudflat.  Oysters are grown in this area, and there are log booms.  Totten Inlet is one of Washington's most productive areas for growing oysters. Oysters grow extremely fast in the inlet's algae-rich water. Taylor Shellfish, the United States' largest producer of farmed shellfish, got its start in Totten Inlet and is still headquartered today near its waters.

Totten Inlet was named by Charles Wilkes during the Wilkes Expedition of 1838–1842, to honor George M. Totten, one of the expedition's midshipmen. Totten Glacier on the Budd Coast of Antarctica is also named for George Totten.

References

External links
 

Inlets of Washington (state)
Bodies of water of Mason County, Washington
Bodies of water of Thurston County, Washington